Les malheurs d'Alfred (The Troubles of Alfred) is a 1972 French comedy film directed by and starring Pierre Richard.

Plot 
Alfred Dhumonttyé is an unemployed architect who is incredibly unlucky. While wanting to commit suicide, he meets a female television presenter who is pursued by the same misfortune.

Cast 
Pierre Richard as Alfred Dhumonttyé
Anny Duperey as Agathe Bodard
Jean Carmet as Paul
Paul Préboist as the peasant
Paul Le Person as the policeman
Mario David as Kid Barrantin, the boxer
Francis Lax as Boggy, the member of the Paris team
Yves Robert as the Parisian TV viewer
Robert Dalban as Gustave, the chauffeur of Morel
Marco Perrin as Orlandi, the manager of Kid
Pierre Mondy as François Morel, the famous game show host
Évelyne Buyle as Lucrèce

Release history 

The film has been released on DVD in Poland as Nieszczęścia Alfreda, in Germany as Alfred, die Knallerbse, and in France with Le distrait in the box Pierre Richard, réalisateur, apparently without subtitles even in French.

References

External links

1972 films
French comedy films
1970s screwball comedy films
Films about television
1972 comedy films
Films scored by Vladimir Cosma
1970s French films